Babcock University is a private Christian co-educational Nigerian university owned and operated by the Seventh-day Adventist Church in Nigeria. The university is located at Ilishan-Remo, Ogun State, Nigeria, equidistant between Ibadan and Lagos.

In 2017, the university had its first set of graduates from the Ben Carson School of Medicine

It is a part of the Seventh-day Adventist education system, which is the world's second largest Christian school system.

History
Babcock University was named after an American missionary by the name of David C. Babcock, who pioneered the work of the Seventh-day Adventist Church in Nigeria in 1914. He was based in Erunmu in Oyo State, Nigeria..

The university was established as the Adventist College of West Africa (ACWA) in 1959, initially with seven students; who were hosted at the home of Chief Olufemi Okulaja. In 1975, it changed its name to Adventist Seminary of West Africa (ASWA).  The university was officially inaugurated on 20 April 1999.

Academic divisions
From the initial four schools, Babcock University has added a postgraduate school in the third quarter of 2010, and a medical school in January 2012. The latest additions are the Music and Educational Foundations departments to the Joel Awoniyi School of Education & Humanities. As at 2013, Babcock hosts eight schools and two colleges: They are:

  School of Social Sciences with departments like Economics, Social works etc.
  School of Management Sciences with departments like Accounting, Business Administration, Marketing, etc. 
  College of Health & Medical Sciences 
  School of Science & Technology
  School of Computing & Engineering Sciences with departments like computer science, software engineering, etc.
  School of Education and Humanities with departments like Education, etc.
  School of Law & Security Studies with departments like Law, International law and diplomacy, etc.
  School of Nursing with departments like Nursing, etc.
  School of Public & Applied Health with departments like Public Health, etc.
  College of Post Graduate Studies.

.Notable alumni 

Adenike Akinsemolu, environmental sustainability advocate, educator, author, a social entrepreneur.
Davido, Musician & Performer.
Debo Ogundoyin, Speaker Oyo State house of Assembly.
Olumide Oworu, Nigerian actor. 
Beverly Osu, actress and model.
Olamide Samuel, International security expert

See also

 List of Seventh-day Adventist colleges and universities
 Seventh-day Adventist education
 Seventh-day Adventist Church
 Seventh-day Adventist theology
 History of the Seventh-day Adventist Church
List of Seventh-day Adventist colleges and universities

References

External links

Universities and colleges affiliated with the Seventh-day Adventist Church
Babcock University
Educational institutions established in 1959
1959 establishments in Nigeria
Christian universities and colleges in Nigeria
Education in Ogun State